Louis-Clair de Beaupoil comte de Saint-Aulaire (9 April 1778, in Baguer-Pican – 13 November 1854, in Paris) was a French politician.

Life
After attending school at the École des ponts et chaussées and polytechnique (from which he graduated in 1794), he served as chamberlain to Napoleon I of France, then prefect of the Meuse in 1813 and of Haute-Garonne in 1814. He was elected to the Chambre des Députés in 1815, and reelected from the Gard département in 1818, 1822 and 1827, but beaten in the elections of 1829. He was then made French ambassador to Rome, Vienna (December 1832 – September 1841) and to London (1841). He was elected a member of the Académie Française in 1841.

Works 
 Histoire de la Fronde  (History of the Fronde, 1827)
 Considération sur la Démocratie  (Consideration on Democracy, 1850)
 Les derniers Valois, les Guises et Henri IV  (The last of the house of Valois, the Guises and Henry IV, 1854)
 Translation of Goethe's Faust (1823)

Sources 
Biography on https://web.archive.org/web/20101224115843/http://www.assemblee-nationale.fr/index.asp

1778 births
1854 deaths
People from Ille-et-Vilaine
Counts of the First French Empire
Politicians from Brittany
Members of the Chamber of Deputies of the Bourbon Restoration
Members of the Chamber of Peers of the Bourbon Restoration
Members of the Chamber of Peers of the July Monarchy
Ambassadors of France to the United Kingdom
Ambassadors of France to the Holy See
Ambassadors of France to the Austrian Empire
19th-century French diplomats
Prefects of France
Prefects of Meuse (department)
Prefects of Haute-Garonne
19th-century French writers
French political writers
19th-century French historians
French male writers
19th-century male writers
Members of the Académie Française